FashionGlobusUkraine is a socio-cultural organization that unites about 80 designers from all regions of Ukraine and has a strategy for the development of the design art and small industry of the country.

History
The date of the organization's appearance can be considered October 1, 2014. That is when the opening of the Center happened. Golda Vynohrads'ka, designer and vice president of the confederation of designers and stylists of Ukraine, was the initiator of its creation.

Scope of the project
Ideological association of designers of all regions of Ukraine gives the opportunity to present their work in the center of Kyiv on Independence Square, symbolizing the unity of the country.

Support of national culture, the study of the map of mental features of clothing.

Tourism development in the capital – visitors have the opportunity to see the colorful things, to be in master classes on handmade, to listen to lectures on the history of costumes in every region, to visit the cultural events.

Drawing the attention of the world community to the huge cultural potential of Ukraine. Interesting common shows of designers from different regions, creation of the image-project that will worthily represent Ukraine abroad. Connections of national cultural diplomacy between the delegations of masters of various countries are improving due to projects of cultural exchange.

Demonstrating the high professional level of Ukrainian designers to prove the global fashion industry that Ukraine is able to offer decent design, engineering and technological solutions.

Implementation of ideas of small industry in Ukraine, cooperation with universities and vocational schools and the Ministry of Education and Science of Ukraine, adaptation of program of students' teaching to the requirements of the nowadays employers' market.

Achievements
A common collection of 12 regions of Ukraine was shown in February 2015 on New York fashion week, which demonstrated the unity of Ukraine's regions, its talent and peacefulness to the world.

The first diplomatic event with the Embassy of Indonesia in Ukraine was on May 15, 2015 to promote cultural exchanges between the countries.

References

External links
FashionGlobusUkraine official website

Fashion organizations